Phippsia is a genus of Arctic and alpine plants in the grass family.

The genus is named in honour of Constantine Phipps, 2nd Baron Mulgrave, 1744-1792 a Royal Navy officer and Arctic explorer, and is commonly known as ice grass or snow grass.

 Species
 Phippsia algida - Scandinavia (incl Iceland + Svalbard), Russia (northern European Russia, Krasnoyarsk, Western Siberia, Yakutia, Kamchatka, Khabarovsk, Magadan), Greenland, Canada (3 Arctic territories, British Columbia, Alberta, Ontario, Quebec, Labrador), United States (Alaska, Montana, Wyoming, Colorado)
 Phippsia concinna - Norway incl Svalbard, Sweden, Greenland, Quebec, Alaska, Russia (Magadan, Yakutia, Western Siberia, Krasnoyarsk, northern European Russia)
 Phippsia wilczekii - Mendoza Province in Argentina

 formerly included
numerous species now considered better suited to other genera: Catabrosa Colpodium Puccinellia

References

Pooideae
Poaceae genera